The 2007 Nigerian House of Representatives elections in Taraba State was held on April 21, 2007, to elect members of the House of Representatives to represent Taraba State, Nigeria.

Overview

Summary

Results

Bali/Gassol 
PDP candidate Kabir Abdullahi Jalo won the election, defeating other party candidates.

Jalingo/Yorro/Zing 
PDP candidate Henry Mashogwawara Shawulu won the election, defeating other party candidates.

Karim Lamido/Lau/Ardo-Kola 
PDP candidate Jerimon S Manwe won the election, defeating other party candidates.

Sardauna/Gashaka/Kurmi 
PDP candidate S.M. Nguroje won the election, defeating other party candidates.

Takuma/Donga/Ussa 
PDP candidate Albert Tanimu Sam Tsokwa won the election, defeating other party candidates.

Wukari/Ibi 
PDP candidate Ishaika Mohammad Bawa won the election, defeating other party candidates.

References 

Taraba State House of Representatives elections